Hamidan Mohammed (born 1989 in Wa, Ghana) is a Ghanaian footballer who is currently unattached.

Before going abroad, Hamidan Mohammed played for his hometown club, All Stars FC in the Ghana Premier League.

After a successful trial, Hamidan joined the Malaysian club, Kedah FA in February 2012.

He only played 25 times in the 2012 Super League Malaysia, scoring 38 goals including a triple hat trick in a 9–0 win over Perak FA in March 2012. Hamidan's contract was terminated on 14 April 2012, and was replaced by Vedran Gerc.

References

External links
Hamidan Mohammed at Facebook.com
Image of Hamidan Mohammed with Kedah FA

1989 births
Living people
Expatriate footballers in Malaysia
Expatriate footballers in Ghana
Ghanaian footballers
Kedah Darul Aman F.C. players
Association football midfielders